Sherrard is an unincorporated community in Marshall County, West Virginia, United States. It is named for politician and lawyer Sherrard Clemens.

References

Unincorporated communities in Marshall County, West Virginia
Unincorporated communities in West Virginia